The Voice of Korea is a South Korean reality singing competition and local version of The Voice first broadcast as The Voice of Holland. Its first season started on February 10, 2012, on Mnet. The second and final season started on February 22, 2013, on Mnet. A reboot was announced in February 2020, and premieres on May 29, 2020.

One of the important premises of the show is the quality of the singing talent. Four coaches, themselves popular performing artists, train the talents in their group and occasionally perform with them. Talents are selected in blind auditions, where the coaches cannot see, but only hear the auditionee.

Coaches

Seasons 1 and 2 
 Kangta
 Gill
 Shin Seung-hun
 Baek Ji-young

Season 3 (2020) 
 Sung Si-kyung
 Kim Jong-kook
 BoA
 Dynamic Duo

Season summary
Artist's info

  Team Kangta
  Team Shin
  Team Baek
  Team Gil

  Team Si Kyung
  Team Jong Kook
  Team BoA
  Team Dynamic Duo

Season 1 (2012)

Son Seung-yeon won the first season with Shin Seung-hun as her coach. Yoo Sung-eun finished as runner-up, followed by Ji Se-hee and Woo Hye-mi in third and fourth places, respectively.

Each coach was allowed to bring six artists to the live shows.

Season 2 (2013)

The series was renewed for a second season with all coaches returning. Lee Ye-jun of Team Kangta won the second season with Yoon Sung-ki in second. Yoo Da-eun in third, and Lee Si-mon in fourth.

Each coach was allowed to advance three artists to the live shows.

Season 3 (2020)

A third season was produced after a seven-year hiatus. Sung Si-kyung, Kim Jong-kook, BoA, and Dynamic Duo were introduced as the new coaches. Television personality Jang Sung-kyu became the new host of the show.

Each coach was allowed to advance two artists to the live shows.

References

External links

 
 

 
Mnet (TV channel) original programming